The 1970 Toronto Argonauts finished in second place in the Eastern Conference with an 8–6 record. They appeared in the Eastern Semi-Final.

Offseason

Regular season

Standings

Schedule

Postseason

Awards and honors
Marv Luster, Defensive Back, CFL All-Star

References

Toronto Argonauts seasons
1970 Canadian Football League season by team